Lucky Luke contre Pat Poker is a Lucky Luke comic by Morris, it was the fifth album in the series and was printed by Dupuis in 1953 and by Cinebook in English in 2013 as Lucky Luke versus Pat Poker. The album contains two stories of Pat Poker - Nettoyage à Red City ("Cleanup in Red City") and Tumulte à Tumbleweed ("Tumult in Tumbleweed").

Stories

Nettoyage à Red City

Synopsis 
Named Sheriff of Red City, Lucky Luke is not at his best when he arrives in the city. Shortly before, he had his clothes and Jolly Jumper stolen while going for a swim in a river. He must ride in the accustomed stagecoach dressed in the clothes of a 10-year-old child.

Red City is a lawless city dominated by Pat Poker, a professional card player (cheater) who leads a gang of outlaws. They receive Luke like a kid, offer him a sheriff's badge, a toy gun and a small wooden horse. Luke is a bit distraught but he quickly picks up. Thanks to a skunk, it helps a citizen not to be hanged by the men of Pat Poker. Then he finds his horse and realizes that it has been stolen by Pat Poker. He plays for it in cards and, against all odds, wins it. Poker advises him to leave before sunset otherwise his skin will not be worth anything. Luke does but he returns at night, hidden in a cart of hay. He first captures two men from Pat Poker as they rob the vault of the breeders bank. Then he tackles Pat Poker himself in his own saloon. Poker manages to escape thanks to another accomplice, the undertaker of the city, but Luke manages quite easily to catch him.

Characters 

Pat Poker: Professional card cheat.
Undertaker of Red City: Accomplice of Pat Poker.
Horseshoe: Underling of Pat Poker who alerts him to the arrival of a new sheriff.
Jack: Hulking henchman of Pat Poker.

Tumulte à Tumbleweed

Synopsis 
Lucky Luke arrives at Tumbleweed after a rough ride. He enters the local saloon and is well received there until the arrival of Angelface, a tough guy who hates foreigners, shepherds and sheep. He threatens Lucky Luke if he does not leave the place. Angelface is distracted by the arrival of a dog in the village. At Tumbleweed, the arrival of a dog heralds the arrival of a shepherd. The mobster follows the dog which leads him to the shepherd who makes his flock of sheep cross the valley. Angry, Angelface tries to hang the shepherd but he is prevented by Lucky Luke who temporarily puts him out of harm's way. The shepherd is quick to leave with his sheep.

Meanwhile, Pat Poker, recently released from prison, arrives at Tumbleweed after crossing the desert. He succeeds playing cards, plucking the owner of the saloon and becomes the new master of the place. When he sees Lucky Luke, he gets scared and tries to trap him. The confrontation does not end to his advantage but Lucky Luke does not have an arrest warrant against him and lets him go. Angelface, who has seen it all, decides to ally himself with Pat Poker. The latter pays him to kill his enemy. A first try in a hotel room ends in failure. Pat Poker then invites Lucky Luke to a game of cards. Angelface will have to shoot him by shooting him in the back of the window of his hotel room. Again, Lucky Luke survives because he suspected something and he took advantage of a moment of inattention from Angelface to sabotage his rifle.

Later, a sheriff arrives at Tumbleweed to catch Pat Poker. At the saloon, he is beaten up by Angelface who seriously injures him, throwing him outside. Lucky Luke searches him and finds an arrest warrant for Pat Poker. He takes the place of the sheriff offside and enters the saloon where he whips Angelface. Pat Poker flees but Luke manages to catch and capture him.

Characters 

 Pat Poker: Escaped from prison (he won the keys from the guard in a game of poker), he takes refuge in Tumbleweed.
 Angelface: Tough guy from Tumbleweed, he hates foreigners, shepherds and sheep. He joins forces with Pat Poker to bring down Lucky Luke.

References

 Morris publications in Spirou BDoubliées

External links
 Lucky Luke official site album index 

Comics by Morris (cartoonist)
Lucky Luke albums
1953 graphic novels
Works originally published in Spirou (magazine)